Kosta Perović (born February 19, 1985) is a Serbian former professional basketball player. He represented the Serbian national basketball team internationally. In the 2006 NBA draft he was a second-round selection of the NBA's Golden State Warriors, with whom he signed on August 3, 2007. A  center, Perović was the tallest player taken in the 2006 NBA Draft. His game has been compared to that of Slovenian center Radoslav Nesterović.

Professional career

Europe
Perović was born in Osijek, SR Croatia, in the former Yugoslavia. He played basketball professionally for Partizan Belgrade at the time of his being drafted by the Golden State Warriors.

After being drafted in 2006, Perović did not immediately come to the NBA. Rather, he played the 2006–07 season in the Serbian League.

NBA
On August 3, 2007, Perović was signed to a two-year contract worth about US$3.5 million with a team option for a third season by Golden State. On November 18, 2007, he was assigned to the NBA D-League after going without an appearance in Golden State's first seven games. He played for the Warriors' affiliate team, the Bakersfield Jam until January 6, 2008, when he was recalled to the Warriors' squad after they waived D. J. Mbenga.

Perović played his first minutes in an NBA game with the Warriors on January 19, 2008 against the Milwaukee Bucks, in which he scored 4 points (on 2 of 2 field goal shooting) and 4 grabbed rebounds (2 offensive), as well as blocking a shot. In 7 games in the NBA, he averaged 1.4 points and 1.9 rebounds per game.

Spanish teams
After being waived by the Warriors on September 12, 2008, Perović reportedly signed a three-year deal worth €3.3 million net income with  Pamesa Valencia of the Spanish ACB. After a mutual termination of the contract with Pamesa Valencia in June 2010, Perović signed with FC Barcelona Bàsquet. In the 2009–2010 season, he averaged 8.4 points and 4.9 rebounds per game.

On August 19, 2012, he signed a one-year deal with the Spanish club Unicaja Málaga.

Russia
In August 2013, Perović signed a one-year deal with Yenisey Krasnoyarsk of Russia. In July 2014, he extended his contract with Yenisey for one more season. In December 2014, he got injured and missed the rest of the season.

Return to Partizan and retirement
On September 29, 2015, he returned to Partizan Belgrade. Struggling to return to his previous form after few months of absence due to a knee injury, he retired from professional basketball on December 15, 2015. He appeared in 12 games of the ABA League, averaging 3.1 points and 2.1 rebounds per game.

National team career
Perović played for the FR Yugoslavian U16 national team at the 2001 European Championship and won a gold medal.
He began his senior national team career at the EuroBasket 2003 when Serbia and Montenegro finished with 6th place. Perović has also been a member of the senior men's Serbian national basketball team. With them he won the silver medal at the EuroBasket 2009. In the following year, he was member of team that finished 4th at the World Championship in Turkey. At the EuroBasket 2011 in Lithuania, where he was capped, Serbia finished 8th.

Post-playing career 
Perović owns and operates a cherry orchard and a plantation of organic ethereal herbs.

Career statistics

Euroleague

|-
| style="text-align:left;"| 2002–03
| style="text-align:left;"| Partizan
| 12 || 2 || 13.2 || .444 || .000 || .786 || 3.3 || .5 || .3 || .9 || 4.5 || 1.2
|-
| style="text-align:left;"| 2003–04
| style="text-align:left;"| Partizan
| 9 || 2 || 22.0 || .491 || .000 || .533 || 4.0 || 1.0 || .4 || .7 || 6.9 || 6.2
|-
| style="text-align:left;"| 2004–05
| style="text-align:left;"| Partizan
| 12 || 9 || 25.9 || .432 || .000 || .623 || 4.7 || .9 || 1.3 || .9 || 9.1 || 9.0
|-
| style="text-align:left;"| 2005–06
| style="text-align:left;"| Partizan
| 13 || 13 || 26.3 || .505 || .000 || .672 || 4.4 || .4 || 1.8 || .6 || 10.4 || 11.2
|-
| style="text-align:left;"| 2006–07
| style="text-align:left;"| Partizan
| 20 || 16 || 26.3 || .500 || .000 || .718 || 6.3 || 1.4 || 1.2 || 1.1 || 10.8 || 15.2
|-
| style="text-align:left;"| 2010–11
| style="text-align:left;"| FC Barcelona
| 17 || 8 || 12.4 || .610 || .000 || .694 || 3.0 || .3 || .4 || .5 || 5.7 || 6.8
|-
| style="text-align:left;"| 2011–12
| style="text-align:left;"| FC Barcelona
| 20 || 11 || 13.2 || .531 || .000 || .786 || 3.3 || .5 || .3 || .9 || 4.5 || 6.6
|-
| style="text-align:left;"| 2012–13
| style="text-align:left;"| Unicaja Málaga
| 21 || 2 || 9.3 || .439 || .000 || .731 || 2.2 || .2 || .2 || .2 || 3.3 || 4.6
|-class="sortbottom"
| style="text-align:center;" colspan="2" | Career
| 124 || 63 || 17.5 || .495 || .000 || .683 || 3.7 || .6 || .7 || .7 || 6.5 || 7.8

NBA

|-
| style="text-align:left;"| 2007–08
| style="text-align:left;"| Golden State
| 7 || 0 || 5.4 || .300 || .000 || .667 || 1.9 || .1 || .0 || .3 || 1.4
|-class="sortbottom"
| style="text-align:center;" colspan="2" | Career
| 7 || 0 || 5.4 || .300 || .000 || .667 || 1.9 || .1 || .0 || .3 || 1.4

See also 
 List of Serbian NBA players

References

External links

 Kosta Perović at aba-liga.com
 Kosta Perović at acb.com 
 Kosta Perović at euroleague.net
 Kosta Perović at fiba.com
 Kosta Perović at fiba.com (game-center)

1985 births
Living people
2006 FIBA World Championship players
2010 FIBA World Championship players
ABA League players
Bakersfield Jam players
Baloncesto Málaga players
BC Enisey players
Centers (basketball)
FC Barcelona Bàsquet players
Golden State Warriors draft picks
Golden State Warriors players
KK Beopetrol/Atlas Beograd players
KK Partizan players
Liga ACB players
National Basketball Association players from Serbia
Serbia men's national basketball team players
Serbian expatriate basketball people in Russia
Serbian expatriate basketball people in Spain
Serbian expatriate basketball people in the United States
Serbian men's basketball players
Serbs of Croatia
Croatian expatriate basketball people in Serbia
Sportspeople from Osijek
Valencia Basket players